Lesbian, gay, bisexual, transgender (LGBT) rights in the Netherlands rank among the highest in the world. Same-sex sexual activity was legalized in 1811 after France invaded the country and installed the Napoleonic Code, erasing any remaining sodomy laws and no more were enacted after the country received independence. An age of consent equal with that of heterosexual activity was put in place in 1971. During the late 20th century, awareness surrounding homosexuality grew and society became more tolerant of gay and bisexual people, eventually leading to its declassification as a mental illness in 1973 and a ban on discrimination based on sexual orientation in the military. The Equal Treatment Act 1994 bans discrimination on account of sexual orientation in employment, housing, public accommodations, and other areas. This was extended in 2019 to include discrimination based on gender identity, gender expression and sex characteristics. After the country began granting same-sex couples registered partnerships benefits in 1998, the Netherlands became the first country in the world to legalize same-sex marriage in 2001. Same-sex joint and stepchild adoption are also permitted, and lesbian couples can access IVF as well.

The Netherlands has become one of the most culturally liberal countries in the world, with recent polls indicating that more than 90% of Dutch people support same-sex marriage. Amsterdam has frequently been named one of the most LGBT-friendly cities in the world, famous for its many accommodations specifically pertaining to the LGBT community, including its many gay bars, bathhouses, hotels, and venues as well as Pink Point, which provides LGBT-friendly information and souvenirs, and the national Homomonument, which was completed in 1987 and was the first monument in the world to commemorate homosexuals who were persecuted and killed during World War II. Since February 2023, both sexual orientation and disability was formally added to the Netherlands Constitution.

Law regarding same-sex sexual activity

Between 1730 and 1811, sodomy was considered a capital crime by the Dutch Republic, resulting in widespread panic throughout the Netherlands and the persecution of hundreds of homosexuals. After the French invaded and installed the Napoleonic Code in 1811, all laws against same-sex sexual activity between consenting adults in private were repealed. After the Dutch received independence in 1813, no new sodomy laws were enacted. The Christian-based political parties enacted Article 248bis of the Penal Code in 1911, which raised the age of consent for same-sex sexual activity to 21 whilst the age of consent for heterosexual activity remained at 16. Laws citing public indecency were also often used against homosexuals.

During World War II, the Nazis introduced Paragraph 175 into Dutch law, which prohibited any same-sex sexual activity once again. The law was repealed after the end of the war.

During the mid-20th century, Dutch psychiatrists and clergy began viewing homosexuality less critically and in 1973, homosexuality was no longer treated as a mental illness. This made way for homosexuals to serve in the military. Article 248bis was repealed in 1971, which equalised the age of consent for same-sex sexual activity. The age of consent is equal and set at 16 years, regardless of gender.

Recognition of same-sex relationships

Dutch law began granting same-sex couples registered partnerships on 1 January 1998 as an alternative for marriage. Registered partnerships are also allowed for opposite-sex couples. The Netherlands became the first country in the world to legalize same-sex marriage in 2001, with the law coming into effect on 1 April. That day, Job Cohen, the Mayor of Amsterdam, married four same-sex couples after becoming a registrar specifically to officiate at the weddings. The bill had passed the House of Representatives by 109 votes against 33. Although same-sex marriages can be performed in the European territory of the Netherlands and the Caribbean territories of Bonaire, Sint Eustatius and Saba, same-sex marriages performed in Aruba, Curaçao and Sint Maarten, which are constituent countries of the Kingdom of the Netherlands, are not officially valid. As a result of article 40 of the Charter for the Kingdom of the Netherlands, same-sex marriages performed anywhere else in the Kingdom must be recognized in all territories, however, they are not required to guarantee equal treatment of same-sex couples with valid marriage licenses.

Before 2014, civil servants could refuse to marry same-sex couples as long as the municipality ensured that other civil servants were available to solemnize the marriage. In 2014, a law was passed that made it illegal for all marriage officiants to refuse their services to same-sex couples.

In October 2021, it was clarified and investigated that "any memberships of the Dutch Royal Family" legally can enter into same-sex marriage in effect since 1 April 2001 – without losing any titles, rights and/or privileges whatsoever.

Adoption and parenting
Same-sex adoption was legalized alongside same-sex marriage in 2001, which includes joint and stepchild adoption. The Dutch Parliament also began allowing same-sex couples to adopt children overseas in 2009. Lesbian couples can get access to IVF treatment, as well as parentage rights for their children. Assisted insemination in case of infertility is covered by health insurance, whether concering single women, opposite-sex couples or lesbian couples.

Altruistic surrogacy is legal in the Netherlands. Commercial surrogacy is illegal, regardless of sexual orientation. Although altruistic surrogacy is legal, there are only a few hospitals that undertake these arrangements, and there are very strict rules. This makes a lot of couples seek their treatment outside the Netherlands. In 2019, at least two IVF clinics in the Netherlands started offering surrogacy services to same-sex couples; one in Leiderdorp helps with the fertilisation of the surrogate mother's eggs, while a second in Gemert-Bakel works with the family members of the couple for a better genetic match.

Discrimination protections
The Dutch Parliament enacted the Equal Treatment Act 1994 in March of that year, which bans (among others) discrimination on the grounds of sexual orientation in employment, housing, and both public and private accommodations. Before March 2019, gender identity, gender expression and sex characteristics were not specifically mentioned, but discrimination was nonetheless banned. There had been cases where the Dutch Institute for Human Rights ruled that transgender people were protected under the clause of "gender". On 16 January 2017, a bill was introduced to explicitly add sex characteristics, gender identity and gender expression to the list of anti-discrimination grounds. The bill was approved by the House (127–23) on 3 July 2018 and by the Senate (64–11) on 12 March 2019. In addition, a motion was passed (123–27) that requested the Rutte Government to investigate whether it is possible to replace the term "heterosexual or homosexual orientation" with the term "sexual orientation" to include all orientations, including bisexual and asexual people.

Recently, a loophole was fixed in the Equal Treatment Act 1994. Before this, government-financed religious schools were not allowed to fire or deny promotions to teachers on the "single fact" of someone's sexual orientation. However, some schools had interpreted this so that they could fire a teacher for behaviours outside of the facility that went against the ethos of the school. This resulted in the termination of a teacher in 2005 for being in a same-sex relationship. This was called de enkelefeitconstructie ("the single fact construction"). A bill that removed the "single fact" rule and ensured that LGBT students and teachers cannot be fired because of their sexual orientation was debated in Parliament in 2014. On 27 May 2014, this bill was approved by the vast majority of the House of Representatives (141–9) and on 10 March 2015 the bill was approved by the Senate (72–3). It went into full effect on 1 July 2015.

A proposal to add disability and sexual orientation as prohibited grounds for discrimination to Article 1 of the Constitution of the Netherlands was approved in the House of Representatives on 30 June 2020 (124 to 26) and in the Senate on 9 February 2021 (58 to 15). The measure now requires approval by the House and Senate by a two-thirds majority following the March 2021 election. On 15 March 2022, the House of Representatives passed the same proposal a second time by a vote of 123 to 25 with 2 members not present. It now moves to the Senate for its second vote. On 17 January 2023, the bill was approved by the vast majority of the Senate (56-15) and now awaits royal assent.  Since February 2023, both sexual orientation and disability was formally added to the Netherlands Constitution.

A 2018 survey by Statistics Netherlands showed that 11.4% of LGBT youth were confronted with online bullying and harassment. This was more than twice as often as heterosexual young people. A survey by the knowledge institute Movisie showed that there were an estimated 900 to 2000 homeless LGBT youth in the Netherlands in 2020. LGBT young people were three times as likely to be homeless that young heterosexual people. Movisie said that "LGBTI youth are often rejected at home and have difficulties accepting themselves".

Transgender and intersex rights
The Dutch parliament voted in favour of the law establishing the right of transgender people to change their legal gender in 1984 and 1985. The law required individuals to undergo gender-affirming surgery and forced sterilization in order to use this right.

In December 2013, the Dutch Parliament overwhelmingly approved a bill allowing transgender people to legally change their gender on birth certificates and other official documents without undergoing sterilization and gender-affirming surgery. The law took effect in 2014. Additionally, transgender people are allowed to serve openly in the military.

Since 1993, it has been possible to state on a birth certificate "sex cannot be determined" when the sex of a newborn baby is unclear. On 28 May 2018, the District Court of Limburg ruled in favour of a Dutch citizen who wished to be recognized as a "third gender" on their birth certificate. Although current laws do not provide for the possibility to be registered as a "third gender", the judge did grant the request for the wording "sex cannot be determined". The court urged lawmakers to provide more options than the current generic "male" (man) and "female" (vrouw) boxes, because the absence of a gender-neutral option is a violation of private life, the right to self-determination and personal autonomy for both transgender and intersex persons. The Dutch Government is currently examining the legal consequences of the ruling. The plaintiff in the case, Leonne Zeegers, received a Dutch passport with an "X" sex descriptor in October 2018. Despite this, as no legislation has been enacted yet, it currently remains a matter for the courts to decide if an individual should receive an "X" designation for gender. The second person to receive an "X" sex marker, Nanoah Struik, did so in July 2019. According to the Social and Cultural Planning Office of the Netherlands, there are an estimated 80,000 intersex people in the Netherlands.

In December 2019, the House of Representatives unanimously adopted a motion presented by Vera Bergkamp and Kirsten van den Hul calling on the Dutch Government to investigate the extent of intersex medical interventions in the Netherlands.

In February 2020, a class-action lawsuit was filed against the Dutch Government over previous sterilisation requirements for transgender individuals. The plaintiffs are also calling on the state to offer compensation to the individuals who were sterilised under the law. A formal apology was issued by the state in December 2020, and a compensation scheme for transgender victims of sterilization (€5,000 for each of the estimated 2,000 victims) was implemented that same month.

In July 2020, it was announced that the Netherlands was considering abolishing gender markers on official identity documents from 2025.

In November 2020, the Dutch cabinet officially apologized for the fact that between 1985 and 2014, transgender people who wanted to change their legal gender were forced to undergo surgery and sterilization. In November 2021 the cabinet announced that individuals who underwent surgery and sterilization because of the 1985 law would become eligible to receive compensation.

In July 2021, a district court granted and allowed a gender X birth certificate to a "self-identified non-binary individual". All non-binary people may now use a gender X birth certificate.

In December 2021, a court ruling dropped psychologist certification for non-binary people to use the X gender marker in passports.

Conversion therapy
Organizations offering conversion therapy, the pseudoscientific practice of attempting to change an individual's sexual orientation or gender identity using psychological or spiritual interventions, in the Netherlands are not eligible for subsidies. In addition, since June 2012, conversion therapies have been blocked from coverage by healthcare insurance.

On 17 May 2019, after television programme , which was broadcast on RTL 5 on 23 April 2019, showed that several organisations, including Dutch Pentecostal and Baptist groups, were offering conversion therapy, the Labour Party (PvdA) and Democrats 66 (D66) requested an investigation into the allegations. In May 2019, the Minister of Health, Welfare and Sport, Hugo de Jonge, informed the House of Representatives that he saw no need to ban conversion therapies in the Netherlands, adding that he was not planning to commission an "in-depth and independent investigation" into the extent to which young people in the Netherlands are exposed to such practices.

On 22 May 2019, the House of Representatives adopted a motion to investigate the extent of gay conversion therapy in the Netherlands. The motion was supported by D66, GroenLinks (GL) and the PvdA, while the ChristenUnie (CU), the Reformed Political Party (SGP) and the Party for Freedom (PVV) voted against. On 29 May, the House of Representatives adopted another motion; this time calling on the Minister of Justice and Security, Ferdinand Grapperhaus, to create a legislative proposal to explicitly ban conversion therapy. Parliamentarians called such 'treatments' "indigestible" and "harmful". The motion was proposed by the People's Party for Freedom and Democracy (VVD), and was supported by the VVD themselves, D66, GL, PvdA and the Socialist Party (SP), while the Christian Democratic Appeal (CDA), CU, PVV, SGP and Forum for Democracy (FvD) voted against. The adopted motion does not provide for a timetable.

Health and blood donation

In the Netherlands, as in many other countries, men who have sex with men (MSM) were previously not allowed to donate blood. The MSM population in developed countries tends to have a relatively high prevalence of HIV/AIDS infection, so a blanket ban was enforced until 2015. In April 2012, the House of Representatives voted on a motion that would make an end to this ban and would make sexual risk behaviour the criteria for blood donation; in response the government asked the blood bank Sanquin and Maastricht University to investigate whether men who have sex with men should be allowed to donate blood. The report presented on 6 March 2015 showed that there were medical scientific grounds to adjust the donor selection policies around men who had sex with other men. This took away the main argument of safety risks. On 28 October 2015, the Ministry of Health, Welfare and Sport announced that a 12-month deferral on donating blood would replace the existing lifetime ban. In February 2019, the Sanquin blood bank shortened this period to 4 months.

On 1 August 2019, the Dutch Government introduced full coverage of PrEP and other related care for gay and bisexual men. The drug is available at all Municipal Health Services (GGD) offices in the country, and can drastically decrease the risk of contracting HIV. In addition, the move would save an estimated €33 million on HIV treatments.

Since September 2021, gay men within monogamous relationships in the Netherlands can legally donate blood without any waiting periods. Gay men within non-monogamous relationships have to still legally undergo a 4-month waiting period.

Public opinion

According to a poll conducted in May 2013, Ifop indicated that 85% of the Dutch population supported same-sex marriage and adoption. A European Union member poll conducted in 2015 indicated that 91% of the Netherlands supported same-sex marriage, which was the highest amount of support during that time. In the Caribbean territories of the Kingdom, the citizens are mostly religious, resulting in larger opposition to same-sex marriage in comparison to the European territory.

The 2019 Eurobarometer showed that 97% of Dutch people believed gay and bisexual people should enjoy the same rights as heterosexual people, and 92% supported same-sex marriage.

Living conditions and civil society

The first gay bars in Amsterdam opened in the early 20th century. The oldest place that still exists today is Café 't Mandje, which was opened in 1927 by Bet van Beeren. The gay magazine Wij ("We") also published during this period. Many of these bars and establishments were shut down during the German occupation of the Netherlands, and with the introduction of Paragraph 175 into Dutch law same-sex sexual activity was criminalized. Following the end of the war, the Shakespeare Club was established, with the goals of social emancipation and offering culture and recreation for gay and lesbian people. It is the oldest existing LGBT organization in the world. During the sexual revolution of the 1960s, many gay bars and clubs opened in a number of cities, and societal acceptance of LGBT people began to grow. The first gay and lesbian protest in the Netherlands took place on 21 January 1969 at the Binnenhof. In 1977, LGBT groups began organising annual marches under the name Pink Saturday. In 1987, the world's first gay memorial, the Homomonument, commemorating LGBT people persecuted during the Nazi period, was opened in Amsterdam.

The Netherlands has frequently been referred to as one of the most gay-friendly countries in the world, on account of its early adoption of LGBT rights legislation and tolerance perception. Amsterdam has been referred to as one of the most gay-friendly cities in the world by publications such as The Independent. The annual gay pride festival has been held in Amsterdam every year since 1996. The festival attracts several hundred-thousand visitors each year and thus one of the largest publicly held annual events in the Netherlands. Amsterdam has also been the host city of the Europride twice, in 1994 and 2016. The latter attracted more than 560,000 visitors. Besides Amsterdam, there are also visible gay scenes in Rotterdam, Utrecht, The Hague and Scheveningen, with several bars, saunas and clubs catering to gay clientele.

A 2013 survey showed that 93% of Dutch people believed homosexuals should live their lives as they wish, with just 4% believing that homosexuality should be rejected. Other opinion polls have also found high levels of public and societal acceptance of LGBT people, again leading many to call the Netherlands one of the most gay-friendly countries in the world. According to a 2016 report from the Netherlands Institute for Social Research, most Dutch people have a positive attitude towards homosexuality. Only 7% of the Dutch viewed homosexuality and bisexuality negatively and 10% viewed transgender people negatively. However, 3.8% of gays and lesbians were victims of violence, compared to 2.4% of heterosexuals. And 32% of the respondents stated they would take offence when seeing two men kiss and 23% when seeing two women kiss (and 12% when seeing two people of the opposite sex kiss).

In April 2017, a same-sex couple was attacked by a group of Moroccan youth in the city of Arnhem. After the attack, several politicians, police officers, priests and many others showed their opposition to LGBT violence by holding hands in public. Displays also occurred in other countries, namely the United Kingdom, the United States and Australia. Approximately 400 to 600 attacks against LGBT people occurred between 2011 and 2017, according to LGBT group COC.

In September 2019, King Willem-Alexander called on the UN General Assembly to support LGBT rights. In November 2019, the Dutch Government announced it would continue to support LGBT rights groups worldwide. The House of Representatives voted for a motion asking that LGBT rights be one of the three priorities of Dutch membership at the United Nations Human Rights Council. The Minister of Foreign Trade and Development Cooperation, Sigrid Kaag, has announced support for international LGBT rights groups, as well as organizations that campaign for food security, nature and climate, women's rights and freedom of expression. With Dutch support, local LGBT organizations in the Seychelles and Botswana were successful in having their anti-gay sodomy laws repealed or struck down.

In July 2020, the city of Nieuwegein ended its twin-city scheme with the Polish city of Puławy due to it enacting a "gay free zone".

Summary table

See also

 Human rights in the Netherlands
 Same-sex marriage in the Netherlands
 Same-sex marriage in Aruba, Curaçao and Sint Maarten
 LGBT rights in Europe
 LGBT rights in the European Union

References

External links